Cyperus tenellus is a sedge of the family Cyperaceae commonly known as the tiny flatsedge.

In Australia it blooms between spring and summer from August to January producing green-brown flowers.

It is an introduced species to Western Australia it is found around swamps and pools or other damp places in the Mid West, Wheatbelt, Peel, South West and Great Southern regions where it grows in sandy, loamy or clay soils often around granite. The species is found in other areas of southern Australia including South Australia and New South Wales.

See also
List of Cyperus species

References

Plants described in 1782
Flora of Western Australia
tenellus